The Prince William Chamber of Commerce is the local chamber of commerce for Prince William County, Virginia, and the cities of Manassas and Manassas Park. The Prince William Chamber of Commerce is one of the largest chambers in the Washington, D.C. metropolitan area, with nearly 1,700 member businesses representing more than 77,000 employees.

Chamber model
The Prince William Chamber is divided into councils and committees, so members can tailor their chamber experience, staying involved and informed in areas of interest to their businesses. Councils bring together members with a shared industry or business concern. Committees empower members to take an active role in bringing the chamber mission to life.

References

External links
 Office Website of Prince William Chamber of Commerce
 Official Website of Prince William County Government

Chambers of commerce in the United States
Prince William County, Virginia